Barb Hendee is a fantasy author.

She is co-author with her husband J. C. Hendee of the Saga of the Noble Dead.

Bibliography

Vampire Memories
 Blood Memories (1999)
 Hunting Memories (2009)
 Memories of Envy (2010)
 In Memories We Fear (2011)
 Ghosts of Memories (2012)

Ghosts of Memories is the last volume in the Vampire Memories series.

Saga of the Noble Dead

Phase 1:
 Dhampir (2003) with J. C. Hendee
 Thief of Lives (2004) with J. C. Hendee
 Sister of the Dead (2005) with J. C. Hendee
 Traitor to the Blood (2006) with J. C. Hendee
 Rebel Fay (2007) with J. C. Hendee
 Child of a Dead God (2008) with J. C. Hendee

Phase 2:
 In Shade and Shadow (2009) with J. C. Hendee
 Through Stone and Sea (2010) with J. C. Hendee
 Of Truth and Beasts (2011) with J. C. Hendee

Phase 3:
 Between Their Worlds (2012) with J. C. Hendee
 The Dog in the Dark (2012) with J. C. Hendee
 A Wind in the Night (2014) with J. C. Hendee
 First and Last Sorcerer (2015) with J. C. Hendee
 The Night Voice (2016) with J. C. Hendee

Mist-Torn Witches:
 The Mist-Torn Witches (May 7, 2013)
 The Witches in Red (May 6, 2014)
 Witches with the Enemy (May, 2015)
 To Kill a Kettle Witch (May, 2016)

Sidestories:
 Homeward
 The Game Piece (April 2012)
 The Feral Path (June 2012)
 The Sapphire (July 2012)
 The Keepers (August 2012)
 The Keepers
 Captives (April 2013) by Barb Hendee and J.C. Hendee
 Claws (June 2013) by Barb Hendee and J.C. Hendee
 The Sleeping Curse (July 2013) by Barb Hendee and J.C. Hendee
 Silent Bells (August 2013) by Barb Hendee and J.C. Hendee
 The Reluctant Guardian (September 2012)
 Tales of Misbelief
 The Forgotten Lord (February 2013) by Barb Hendee and J.C. Hendee
 The Forgotten Mistress (September 2013, ISBN B00F8OL8Z4) by Barb Hendee and J.C. Hendee
 Sagecraft
 Puppy Love (June 2013) by Barb Hendee and J.C. Hendee

References

External links
 
 Noble Dead official website
 Bibliography at SciFan
 

20th-century American novelists
21st-century American novelists
American fantasy writers
American women novelists
Living people
Women science fiction and fantasy writers
20th-century American women writers
21st-century American women writers
Year of birth missing (living people)